The women's 60 metres event  at the 1997 IAAF World Indoor Championships was held on March 7.

Medalists

Results

Heats
First two of each heat (Q) and next 4 fastest (q) qualified for the semifinals.

Semifinals
First 2 of each semifinal (Q) qualified directly for the final.

Final

References

60 metres
60 metres at the World Athletics Indoor Championships
1997 in women's athletics